Andreas Walser (13 April 1908 – 19 March 1930) was a Swiss painter. He was born in Chur and moved to Paris at the age of 20 to become more involved in the art world and "to become completely and utterly french". Many of his works were produced under the influence of drugs. He died in Paris aged 22.

References

20th-century Swiss painters
Swiss male painters
1908 births
1930 deaths
People from Chur
Swiss emigrants to France
20th-century Swiss male artists